Tales of the Vikings is an American first-run syndicated television series, first telecast on 8 September 1959 and ran through June 2, 1960. The series was produced by Kirk Douglas' production company, Brynaprod.

Plot
Set in tenth century Scandinavia, the series presented the seafaring exploits of Viking chief Firebeard and his two sons, Leif and Finn.

Characters
Firebeard, Viking chieftain - Stefan Schnabel
Leif, Firebeard's younger son - Jerome Courtland
Finn, Firebeard's elder son - Walter Barnes
Haldar, Viking crewman - Buddy Baer

Guest stars for the thirty-nine episode run included: Christopher Lee, Patrick McGoohan, Robert Alda, and Edmund Purdom.

Production
In 1949 Douglas founded his own company, Bryna Productions, named after his mother. Tales of the Vikings was the company's first venture into television. The series, like the Douglas' 1958 film The Vikings, was shot in Europe and used footage, sets, props, and costumes from the film. It was filmed in black and white, and distributed by United Artists Television.  Since Tales of the Vikings aired in syndication, air dates varied from one TV station to another during the 1959-1960 season. It also aired on British television, and in 1962 in Finland.

Courtland has his hair and beard dyed blond for the series. Ryan O'Neal got his start on Tales of the Viking. His parents, who were living abroad at the time, got the teenager a job as a stuntman, under veteran John Sullivan, learning fights, falls, and duels.
The theme song was written by Bert Grund with lyrics by Sid Morse.

References

External links
Tales of the Vikings at Classic TV Archive

Theme Song from Tales of the Vikings

First-run syndicated television programs in the United States
American adventure television series
1959 American television series debuts
1960 American television series endings
Bryna Productions films
Television series by United Artists Television
Television series set in the Viking Age
Television series set in the 10th century